Aghasht (also Romanized as Āghasht and Āghesht; also known as Aghsha and Ātesheh) is a village in Baraghan Rural District, Chendar District, Savojbolagh County, Alborz Province, Iran. At the 2006 census, its population was 190, in 65 families.

References 

 http://seeiran.ir/%D8%B1%D9%88%D8%B3%D8%AA%D8%A7%DB%8C-%D8%A2%D8%BA%D8%B4%D8%AA/

Populated places in Savojbolagh County